Under The Influence of... is the second studio album by Love Unlimited.

Reception

Released in the summer of 1973, this album would chart at #3 in the U.S. R&B charts and reach #1 in Canada on the RPM national albums chart.

Track listing
All tracks composed by Barry White; except here indicated
 "Love's Theme" (Instrumental) - 4:08
 "Under the Influence of Love" - (White, Paul Politi  )  4:09
 "Lovin' You, That's All I'm After" - 4:29
 "Oh Love, Well We Finally Made It" - 3:50
 "Say It Again" - 3:19
 "Someone Really Cares For You" - 5:40
 "It May Be Winter Outside (But in My Heart It's Spring)" - (White, Paul Politi)  4:14
 "Yes, We Finally Made It" - 3:45

Charts

Singles

References

External links
 Love Unlimited-Under The Influence of... at Discogs

1973 albums
Love Unlimited albums
20th Century Fox Records albums